Merangin is a regency (kabupaten) of Jambi Province on the island of Sumatra, Indonesia. The regency covers an area of 7,668.61 km2, and had a population of 333,206 at the 2010 census and 354,052 at the 2020 census, comprising 180,357 male and 173,695 female.

Administrative districts 
Merangin Regency is divided into twenty-four districts (kecamatan), tabulated below with their areas and their populations at the 2010 census and the 2020 census. The table also includes the locations of the district administrative centres, the number of administrative villages (205 rural desa and 10 urban kelurahan in total) in each district, and its post code.

However, the last-mentioned eight districts, comprising the northern third of Merangin Regency, are in the process of being separated out to form a new Regency - Kabupaten Tabir Raya; these eight districts cover 2,000.07 km2 and had an estimated combined population of 113,841 at the 2020 census.

Merangin Geopark
Merangin Geopark has been proposed to UNESCO to be a World's Heritage Merangin Geopark and UNESCO team has visited Merangin Geopark. The geopark has Araucarioxylon fossil tree complete with the root of 300 million years, the oldest in Asia. Today the ancient Merangin River is usually used for white water sports.

References

External links 

 

Regencies of Jambi